Waimānalo Beach is a census-designated place (CDP) located in the City & County of Honolulu, in the District of Koolaupoko, on the island of Oahu in the U.S. state of Hawaii.  This small windward community is located near the eastern end of the island, and the climate is dry. As of the 2020 census, the CDP had a population of 4,823. This neighborhood is close to, but somewhat separate from Waimānalo, although the two form a single community.

Waimānalo Beach has sparse commercial development along Kalanianaole Highway, and is noteworthy for its local flavor and proximity to Makapuu Beach and Sea Life Park, which lie closer to Makapuu Point at the east end of the island of Oahu. There are no hotels here.

The U.S. postal code for Waimānalo Beach and Waimānalo is 96795.

Kazuo Sakamaki, the first prisoner of war taken by U.S. forces during World War II, was captured on December 8, 1941, on Waimānalo Beach the day after the surprise attack on Pearl Harbor and surrounding targets in Honolulu by Imperial Japanese Navy forces.

The Anderson Estate, which was featured in the TV series Magnum, P.I. as "Robin's Nest", is located in Waimānalo Beach.

Geography 
Waimānalo Beach is located at  (21.333657, -157.698055). The nearest town is Waimānalo to the west.

The total area is 33.45% water.

Demographics 

As of the census of 2000, there were 4,271 people, 1,006 households, and 848 families residing in the CDP. The racial makeup of the CDP was 12.97% White, 0.09% African American, 0.23% Native American, 5.34% Asian, 47.39% Pacific Islander, 0.63% from other races, and 33.34% from two or more races.  6.49% of the population were Hispanic or Latino of any race.

There were 1,006 households, out of which 28.7% had children under the age of 18 living with them, 51.4% were married couples living together, 23.2% had a female householder with no husband present, and 15.7% were non-families. 8.9% of all households were made up of individuals, and 2.7% had someone living alone who was 65 years of age or older.  The average household size was 4.25 and the average family size was 4.50.

In the CDP the population was spread out, with 26.7% under the age of 18, 10.3% from 18 to 24, 28.9% from 25 to 44, 22.5% from 45 to 64, and 11.6% who were 65 years of age or older.  The median age was 35 years.  For every 100 females there were 97.5 males.  For every 100 females age 18 and over, there were 92.7 males.

The median income for a household in the CDP was $55,781, and the median income for a family was $57,281. Males had a median income of $35,074 versus $25,440 for females. The per capita income for the town was $16,089.  8.5% of the population and 5.5% of families were below the poverty line.  Out of the total population, 5.3% of those under the age of 18 and 7.9% of those 65 and older were living below the poverty line.

Education
Hawaii Department of Education operates public schools. Blanche Pope Elementary School is in the CDP.

See also
List of beaches in Hawaii

References

External links

Census-designated places in Honolulu County, Hawaii
Beaches of Oahu
Populated coastal places in Hawaii